"The Long Legs of the Law" is the first episode of series 2 of the BBC sitcom, Only Fools and Horses. It was first broadcast on 21 October 1982. The title of the episode was a pun on the police term "the long arm of the law". In the episode, Del is horrified when he discovers that Rodney is dating a policewoman.

Synopsis
It is the morning after a party at the Nag's Head attended by Del Boy and Rodney, which broke into a riot. It emerges that to break up the trouble, a young policewoman (Sandra) had been sent, and Del teases Rodney for trying to ask her out for a date whilst she was dealing with the offenders. Later at Sid's Cafe Rodney reveals that he had in fact been successful, and has arranged a date with her, much to Del's disapproval.

Ignoring Del's pleas, Rodney takes Sandra out. Del and Grandad intensely discuss the implications of Rodney dating a police officer for their business. Del ultimately concludes that a wrong word from Rodney and they could serve five years imprisonment.

Rodney returns home late at night and Grandad reveals to Del that he has brought Sandra home with him, resulting in a nervous Del desperately trying to hide some of the illegal goods in the flat, including three cases of export-only gin and some stolen watches recently purchased from Trigger. Rodney and Sandra enter, and Del suddenly realises that Rodney has given her one of Trigger's watches. He gets it off her after "accidentally" spilling some gin over it, but says that they cannot give her another glass of gin, since they have run out, only for Rodney – impulsively – to reveal the three cases of it hidden behind the curtains by Del.

Back outside Sandra's flat, she and Rodney say farewell. She tells Rodney that she had indeed noticed all the illegal goods in the flat, despite Del's efforts to hide them. Rodney, realising that the situation is his fault, takes the blame for all of the stolen goods in the flat, even though he knows it will probably result in his arrest and will certainly put an end to any hopes of dating Sandra again. However, because she enjoyed the night, rather than arrest him, Sandra decides to give the Trotters 24 hours to get rid of the stolen property, before she returns with the CID. Rodney asks Sandra to go out on another date, but she sternly tells him not to push his luck.

The final scene shows the Trotters in their now near-empty flat, with all three still frantically removing stuff and Del still threatening to kill Rodney for getting them into the mess.

Episode cast

Kate Saunders considered her natural accent to be unsuitable for the role so modelled her accent on that of the lead character on the contemporary series The Gentle Touch.

First appearances 

 Roy Heather as Sid

Episode concept
The idea for the script was based on John Sullivan's niece, who worked as a policewoman.

References

External links

1982 British television episodes
Only Fools and Horses (series 2) episodes
Works about police officers